HKT may refer to:
 German Eastern Marches Society, (Hakata or H-K-T), a German organisation 1894–1934
 Helsingin Kisa-Toverit, a Finnish sport club
 Hong Kong Telecom
 Hong Kong Tramways
 Hong Kong Time
 , a former newspaper
 Höckmayr KFZ-Technik, Lotus 7 clone manufacturer 
 Phuket International Airport, in Thailand
 Higher-kinded type